Nude swimming is the practice of swimming without clothing, whether in natural bodies of water or in swimming pools. A colloquial term for nude swimming is "skinny dipping".

In both British and American English, to swim means "to move through water by moving the body or parts of the body". In British English, bathing also means swimming; but in American English, bathing refers to washing, or any immersion in liquid for hygienic, therapeutic, or ritual purposes. Many terms reflect British usage, such as sea bathing and bathing suit, although swimsuit is now more often used.

In prehistory and for much of ancient history, both swimming and bathing were done without clothes, although cultures have differed as to whether bathing ought to be segregated by sex. Christian societies have generally opposed mixed nude bathing, although not all early Christians immediately abandoned Roman traditions of mixed communal bathing. In Western societies into the 20th century, nude swimming was common for men and boys, particularly in male-only contexts and to a lesser extent in the presence of clothed women and girls. Some non-Western societies have continued to practice mixed nude bathing into the present, while some Western cultures became more tolerant of the practice over the course of the 20th century.

The contemporary practices of naturism include nude swimming. The widespread acceptance of naturism in many European countries has led to legal recognition of clothing-optional swimming in locations open to the public. After a brief period of popularity in the 1960s-1970s of public "nude beaches" in the United States, acceptance is declining, confining American nude swimming generally to private locations.

History 

Based upon rock painting found in caves, the human activity of swimming existed for many thousands of years prior to the first civilizations, during which humans were generally naked.

Ancient to early modern 
In Ancient Egypt, clothing was symbolic of social status, making adult nudity an indicator of low status or poverty. However, children, even of the upper classes, would be naked until puberty. Manual laborers of either sex would wear a loincloth or skirt unless their tasks included swimming; fishermen and boatmen often being nude.

In ancient Rome, clothing also represented social status, but public bathhouses were an exception. Bathhouses might include swimming pools that were located in open courtyards.

Swimming became increasingly unpopular after the fall of the Western Roman Empire, being viewed by the Christian church as both sinful and unhealthy. In spite of church teaching, swimming and bathing returned in the 12th century, sometimes without segregation of the sexes. Defying the Church of England, Everard Digby's book The Art of Swimming (De Arte Natandi) was published in 1587. Melchisédech Thévenot's 1696 instruction book, also called The Art of Swimming, was illustrated by 40 copperplate etchings that showed swimming was normally nude.

Indigenous peoples swimming naked were depicted by colonists in the Americas beginning in the 16th century.

Modern era

Australia 
In the Victorian era, public baths and swimming pools were built in Adelaide to address problems of health and safety, but also to reduce the persistence of nude swimming in open waters. Swimming costumes were issued to pool patrons.

England

18th century
The Bath Corporation official bathing dress code of 1737 prohibited men and women from swimming nude either in the day or in the night.

In the early 1730s, fashionable sea bathing initially followed the inland health-seeking tradition. Sea bathing resorts modelled themselves on Bath, and provided promenades, circulating libraries, and assembly rooms. While sea bathing or dipping, men and boys were naked. Women and girls were encouraged to dip wearing loose clothing. Scarborough was the first resort to provide bathing machines for changing. Some men extended this to swimming in the sea, and by 1736, it was seen at Brighton and Margate, and later at Deal, Eastbourne, and Portsmouth.

In England, bathing in the sea by the lower classes was noted in Southampton by Thomas Gray in 1764, and in Exmouth in 1779. In Lancashire, working women and men bathed naked in the sea together in 1795: "Lower classes of people of both sexes made an annual pilgrimage to Liverpool where they dabbled in the salt water for hours at each tide in promiscuous numbers and not much embarrassing themselves about appearance."

19th Century

At the beginning of the Victorian period in England, men and boys typically swam naked in the sea near bathing machines that were used by women. Some efforts were made to designate separate beach sections for males and females. An 1842 review of seaside resorts noted that naked men in the sea were a primary attraction for visitors to Ramsgate, including women. The writer finds this no different from women viewing images of nude men in art galleries, near-naked men in the opera, or workers in the water. On the River Cherwell near the University of Oxford, an area for male nude bathing was known as Parson's Pleasure; a nearby area for female nude bathing which closed in 1970 was known as Dame's Delight.

In the latter half of the 19th century, the rise of the influence of Christian Evangelicals caused arrangements for mixed bathing to be reassessed. Moral pressures led some town councils to establish zones for the women and men to bathe separately. These areas were not policed; mixed bathing was a popular activity. Resorts attempted to placate the Evangelicals without upsetting traditional bathers. There are very few records of magistrates enforcing the bylaws. In 1895 Cosmopolitan reported: "At most English resorts, buff bathing is available before eight o'clock in the morning" while Brighton, Worthing, Hastings, Bexhill, Bognor and Folkestone still tolerated nude bathing at any time of the day, in areas away from the central bathing areas.

Drawers, or caleçons as they were called (fr:caleçon de bain), came into use in the 1860s. Even then, many protested against them and wanted to remain in the nude. Rev. Francis Kilvert, an English clergyman and nude swimmer, described men's bathing suits coming into use in the 1870s as "a pair of very short red and white striped drawers". Excerpts from Kilvert's diary show the transition in the England of the 1870s from an acceptance of nude bathing to the acceptance of bathing suits. Kilvert describes "a delicious feeling of freedom in stripping in the open air and running down naked to the sea."

In 1895, The Daily Telegraph, Standard, Daily Graphic and Daily Mail newspapers ran a campaign to reintroduce mixed bathing in all resorts, pointing out that its prohibition split up families and encouraged them to take their holidays abroad. Commercial pressure defeated the moral pressures. Sea bathing had ceased to be done for health reasons, and was done overwhelmingly for pleasure. As the segregated beaches in town disappeared, bathing costumes for men became part of the commercial package, and nude bathing ceased. 

The introduction of mixed bathing throughout Europe and elsewhere certainly created pressure towards bathing costumes being worn by both genders. However, well into the latter days of the Victorian Era, whereas all females were routinely wearing modest bathing attire, many boys well into their teens in Victorian England, even when in a mixed gender setting, were still swimming and playing at the beach resorts completely naked. An article published on August 23, 1891, in the Syracuse Sunday Herald suggests naked boys of up to 15 years in age were problematic for American parents with daughters, and read:

South Africa
From 1873, the East London, Eastern Cape town council promulgated measures to control swimming hours, apparel and especially separate swimming areas for men and women. These regulations were too conservative and constraining for the taste of the residents of this coastal town and for several decades they were the subject of legal battles, or were simply ignored. The dispute was finally settled in 1906 when mixed bathing was permitted with the proviso that both men and women should wear suitable swimming costumes.

United States
Benjamin Franklin and John Quincy Adams were known to skinny dip.

20th century 

Since the early 20th century, the naturist movement has developed in western countries, seeking a return to non-sexual nudity when swimming and during other appropriate activities.

Canada
In the late 19th to early 20th century, using tax revenue to provide public bathing facilities for working-class men was not politically popular in London, Ontario, while private establishments served the middle and upper classes. These included swimming at the YMCA, which required membership or payment of fees. However, the problem of men being publicly naked while swimming and bathing in open water was recognized. Efforts to regulate nude swimming with laws against doing so during daylight hours did not prevent increases in incidents in the 1860s through the 1880s by laborers and boys.

In the 19th century, boys and working class men in Toronto swimming nude in the Humber and Don Rivers was allowed in secluded swimming holes, while officially prohibited elsewhere. Skinny-dipping was seen by many as an innocent activity for young males, as long it did not intrude upon the sensibilities of females. In the 20th century, urban growth had encroached upon this isolation, and also created the problem of water pollution. The development of beaches in the Sunnyside district on the Lake Ontario waterfront marked the end of nude outdoor swimming.

As in the United States, men swam nude at the YMCAs until they became coed.

China
In 2004 after some local university students went skinny-dipping there, signs were placed at a riverside beach in a public park in Zhejiang province declaring a section to be a nudist beach. Following complaints from other park visitors, the signs were removed, although officially China has no law forbidding swimming nude. In a July 2005 a heat wave, a number of incidents of men skinny-dipping were noted.

England
In English boys' schools (Manchester Grammar School, for example), students recall nude swimming being required at least from the 1930s until the 1970s. No official reason for the practice was given, but some mention the problem in the early years of fibres from wool swimsuits clogged pool filters. However, nude swimming continued when modern swimsuit materials were available.

United States
In the United States, skinny-dipping by young people, mostly boys, was common in rural areas across the country. As towns such as Logan, Utah, Humboldt, Iowa and Dixon, Illinois grew in the 1890s, the traditional locations became more visible to the public, and local ordinances were implemented prohibiting nude swimming, but were difficult to enforce, or involved very young children who were not punished. Among the features of rural Vermont being overtaken by development in the 1970s, an editorial mentions the removal of forests that sheltered ponds where boys had been swimming naked for 200 years. Older residents of Duncanville, Texas, remembered the "Blue Hole" on Ten Mile Creek a few hundred feet west of Main Street as the place to skinny-dip for decades. In 1967, misbehavior including drinking, fighting, and accidents led to complaints and calls to make the place off-limits.

American president Theodore Roosevelt described nude swims in the Potomac with his "tennis cabinet" in his Autobiography: "If we swam the Potomac, we usually took off our clothes".

Ernest Thompson Seton describes skinny dipping as one of the first activities of his Woodcraft Indians, a forerunner of the Scout movement, in 1902. A 1937 article on swimming at boy scout summer camps in Washington state makes no mention of the boys being naked in almost all the photographs. Descriptions of special "carnival" days that were coed did not mention whether swimsuits were available. It does state "Both boys and girls enjoy the thrill of swimming in the nude, so on occasion, suits may be discarded for the night plunge." Night swimming was allowed only in camps were this was safe.

Swimming in indoor pools

Initially, men and boys swam in the nude in indoor swimming pools, as had previously been customary in lakes and rivers. YMCAs everywhere had nude swimming beginning in the 1890s until they became coed in the 1960s. Given the limits of chlorination at that time, behavioral measures were used to maintain water quality. In 1933, in addition to recommending nudity, all bathers were required to empty their bladder and shower before entering the pool. Those suffering from skin or repiratory disease were prohibited from using the pool. In 1940 health experts continued to favor boys wearing bathing suits only in pools visible to both sexes. Girls were issued cotton suits that could be boiled to disinfect them between uses; the wool suits used by boys could not because they would shrink. It was also noted that wool suits that had previously been used in salt water could not be washed effectively because salt prevents soap from lathering. In 1926, the American Public Health Association (APHA) standards handbook recommended that indoor swimming pools used by men adopt nude bathing policies and that indoor swimming pools used by women require swimsuits "of the simplest type". Students bringing their own suits was discouraged, the institutions not having control of decontamination.

In 1947 girls at the Liberty School in Highland Park, Michigan, also swam nude in their classes. Boys not having worn suits for years, girls requesting to do the same in order to give them more time in the pool rather than changing. After six weeks, the girls in the middle school were ordered to wear suits, but the elementary school girls continued to be nude. While following the wishes of parents who believed older girls should behave modestly, all the board members disagreed, stating that there was "no moral issue involved".

New developments in pool chlorination, filtration, and nylon swimsuits led the APHA to abandon its recommendation of nude swimming for males in 1962. However, the custom did not immediately cease. During the 1970s, the adoption of mixed-gender swimming led to the gradual abandonment of nude male swimming in schools. Federal Title IX rules mandating equality in physical education led most schools to switch to co-educational gym classes by 1980, ending nude swimming in public schools. In the 21st century, the practice has been forgotten, denied having existed, or viewed as an example of questionable behaviors in the past that are no longer acceptable. However, Jungian psychoanalyst Barry Miller views the sexualization of nudity in male only situations such as locker rooms and swimming pools as a loss.

Contemporary practices 

In many countries in the 21st century, nude swimming mostly takes place at nude beaches, naturist facilities, private swimming pools, or secluded or segregated public swimming areas. Some Western countries, such as Canada and the United Kingdom, have no laws prohibiting nude swimming in public areas, but some countries around the world strictly enforce various laws against public nudity, including nude swimming. Some jurisdictions which maintain laws against public nudity may turn a blind eye to incidents of skinny dipping depending on the circumstances, as police officers on the spot decline to make arrests.

A 2006 Roper poll showed that 25% of all American adults had been skinny dipping at least once, and that 74% believed nude swimming should be tolerated at accepted locations. Nude swimming is fairly common in rural areas of the United States, where unexpected visitors are less likely. However, in some places, even that type of swimming is prohibited by law. There is no federal law against nudity. Nude beaches such as Baker Beach in San Francisco operate within federal park lands in California. However, under a provision called concurrent jurisdiction, federal park rangers may enforce state and local laws against nudity or invite local authorities to do so. Skinny-dippers generally deal with this by keeping an eye out for local patrols, who generally do not go out of their way to find violators. Many swimmers in the United States confine nude swimming to private locations due to concerns about attitudes to public nudity.

In Germany, nude bathing is more widespread than in many other countries. A 2014 study revealed Germans (28%) were the most likely of all nations surveyed to have been nude at a beach.

The world record for the largest skinny dip—2,505 persons—was set on 9 June 2018 at Meaghermore beach in County Wicklow, Ireland. The record was set at an annual all-women's event known as Strip and Dip, which was created by cancer survivor Deirdre Featherstone. The 2018 event raised money for a national children's cancer charity.

Artistic depictions

Nude swimming was a common subject of Old Masters – painters from before the 19th century – and Romantic oil paintings, usually bucolic or in a mythological or historical settings. For example, Swedish painters Georg Pauli and Anders Zorn painted a number of nude swimming scenes.

Late in the 19th century, painters started to render nude boys and men in realistic settings. Daumier's Bathers shows youths clumsily hauling off their clothes (a symbol of repression) and a naked short stocky youth stepping cautiously into the water that represents freedom. Seurat's Bathers Asnières uses similar symbolism to show the bathers removing their everyday identities to step into the momentary sunlight.

The bathers in Thomas Eakins' The Swimming Hole each represent different stages in the artist's life. He prepared for this canvas by taking multiple photographs of his students frolicking at this location. The painting portrays a happy physical un-selfconsciousness seen through the perspective of age; a nostalgia for youth. By the 1880s, this nostalgia for youth was a veneer carefully disguising a latent homosexuality. In contrast, there were poets and painters who would contrast the free young beauty of bodies in the water with the approaching grind of maturity and responsibility. Henry Scott Tuke painted naked bathers in a soft, idealized style, deliberately avoiding overt sexuality.

Cezanne's monumental male bathers derive from memories of a happy childhood rather than direct observation. This was described by his friend Emile Zola as a time when "they were possessed with the joys of plunging (naked) into the deeper pools where the waters flowed, or spending the days stark naked in the sun, drying them selves on the burning sand, diving in once more to live in the river..."

In later periods, depictions of nude swimming scenes became rarer, but more likely to depict straightforward contemporary scenes. The cover of the August 19, 1911, edition of the Saturday Evening Post had a Leyendecker painting of three boys; the cover of the June 4, 1921, edition had Norman Rockwell's painting No Swimming, depicting boys in various states of undress escaping from the local authorities.

In Movies

A number of films have become notable in whole or in part due to reaction to their nude swimming scenes.
 1918  – Tad's Swimming Hole, was a 1918 silent comedy film by King Vidor, it had frontal shots of nude boys that were censored in some places e.g. Chicago.
 1933 – The film Ecstasy was banned in many places and censored in others. The film included a nude swimming scene with Hedy Lamarr in her film debut.
 1934 – Tarzan and His Mate featured the female lead (played by a double) swimming nude. However, religious groups lobbied to have the scene removed. Three versions of this movie now exist.
 1943 – Child Bride featured the female lead, 12-year-old Shirley Mills, swimming nude. It is considered the most notable scene on the film.
 1960 – The opening scene of the Disney film, Pollyanna starts with a close-up of a nude 7-year-old blond boy, William Betz, on a rope swing dropping into White Sulfur Springs, Santa Rosa, California; his mother was an extra on the film. This motif showed that Harrington was a normal 'small American town' where the 'folk' enjoyed normal activities. Disney has a reputation for being morally conservative; thus boys swimming nude was an everyday event.
 1969 – In director Michael Powell's film Age of Consent, an extended scene shows Helen Mirren, playing a teenage girl, swimming underwater in an Australian reef.
 1971 – Walkabout, an Australian/British film directed by Nicolas Roeg, shows actress Jenny Agutter and actors David Gulpilil and Luc Roeg swimming nude. The nude swimming scenes are set in several water holes in the Australian outback, during an extended time disconnected from civilization.
 1984 – Greystoke: The Legend of Tarzan, Lord of the Apes, an American/British film directed by Hugh Hudson, shows actor Danny Potts swimming nude. The nude swimming scene is set is when after a gorilla is being attacked by a black panther that a five-year-old Tarzan learns how to swim.

See also 
 Naturism
 Nude beach
 Nightswimming - Song by R.E.M. that refers to skinny-dipping.
 Nude recreation
 Public bathing

References

Further reading

External links 

 The Naturist Society (us)
 South Florida Free Beaches (Haulover Beach Park)
 Naturist Education Foundation (us)
 Crown Prosecution Service – Nudity in Public – Guidance on handling cases of Naturism (UK specific)

History of swimming
Nude recreation